General Nirmal Chander Vij PVSM, UYSM, AVSM (born 3 January 1943, in Jammu) was the 21st Chief of Army Staff  of the Indian Army. He held the office from 1 Jan 2003 to 31 Jan 2005.

Early life and education
General Vij was born on 3 January 1943 at Jammu. He completed his studies at the SRML Higher Secondary School, Jammu and joined the National Defence Academy (NDA) in 1959. He was commissioned into the Dogra Regiment on 11 December 1962.

Military career
Within weeks of his commissioning, he saw action in the Walong sector in the 1962 Indo-China War. Since then he has served in the eastern sector six times, the last time being as the General officer commanding IV Corps. Vij has served as the General staff officer of an infantry division, a director in the Military Operations Directorate as a colonel and deputy director general of perspective planning (strategic planning) as a brigadier at Army HQ in New Delhi.

Vij served as the Major General General Staff (MGGS) at the Western Command in Chandimandir, Chandigarh (Punjab). During the 1999 Kargil War, he served as the Director General Military Operations (DGMO). In 1999, he broke the military tradition to brief members of the Bharatiya Janata Party (BJP) on operations in Kargil.   He was criticized for appearing, in his professional capacity before a group of senior BJP leaders, and briefing them. 

For his services as the DGMO, he was awarded the Uttam Yudh Seva Medal. He was involved was the planning and execution of Operation Khukri – to extricate trapped Indian peacekeeping troops in Sierra Leone. The formations he has commanded include a mountain brigade involved in active counter-insurgency operations in the north east, an elite RAPID (Reorganised Army Plains Infantry Division) unit, the XXI Strike Corps based at Bhopal, Madhya Pradesh and the IV Corps based at Tezpur, Assam. He is also a recipient of the Param Vishisht Seva Medal (PVSM). On 1 October 2000, Vij was appointed as the GOC of Southern Command at Pune and led the army's rescue efforts during the 2001 Gujarat earthquake. In October 2001, he was appointed as the Vice Chief of Army Staff (VCOAS) at New Delhi and in January 2002, he was appointed as the 10th Colonel of the Dogra Regiment and the Dogra Scouts. 

He was appointed as the Chairman Chiefs of Staff Committee (COSC) on 1 January 2005. He is married to Rita Vij and they have a son, Nalin, who is a software engineer in the United States. General Vij retired on 31 January 2005, after completing more than 42 years service.

Post retirement
He was the founder-Vice Chairman of the National Disaster Management Authority, with an equivalent rank of a Union Minister of State. He was the Director of the Vivekananda International Foundation think tank in New Delhi. In 2021, his book "The Kashmir Conundrum: The Quest for Peace in a Troubled Land" was published by Harper Collins.

Recent controversy 
Builders by name Adarsh Housing Cooperative Society have been constructing buildings in the prime government land in Mumbai. The permission for construction on this government land has been taken in name of providing the affordable accommodation to war widows and the land had been reserved for this purpose. However, many politicians, top military officials, other bureaucrats and their relatives have taken the ownership of the flats. Ashok Chavan, former chief minister of Maharashtra, resigned under pressure for his role in this scam. CBI is probing the scam. Gen N C Vij along with two other former military chiefs – General Deepak Kapoor, and Admiral Madhvendra Singh offered to give up their apartments.

Awards

Dates of rank

References

1943 births
Living people
Chiefs of Army Staff (India)
People from Jammu (city)
Vice Chiefs of Army Staff (India)
Indian generals
National Defence College, India alumni
Recipients of the Param Vishisht Seva Medal
Recipients of the Uttam Yudh Seva Medal
Recipients of the Ati Vishisht Seva Medal